Johanna Peña-Álvarez (born 6 January 1983) is a Dominican former professional boxer who competed from 2000 to 2004. She challenged once for the WIBF flyweight title in 2004.

Early and personal life
Álvarez began boxing at the age of 13 and turned professional at 14 under the tutelage of her father Ruddy Peña.

Career
Álvarez made her professional debut at the age of seventeen, on 29 June 2000, winning a second-round technical knockout (TKO) over Natali Lara. She won her second bout, before losing a six-round unanimous decision to Gisselle Salandy on 8 August 2000. Álvarez would go 12–0–1 in her next 13 fights, before losing a ten-round decision to WIBF flyweight champion Regina Halmich on 17 January 2004 in Germany.

Álvarez would return to the ring on 19 March 2004, fighting to a six-round draw with Delia Gonzalez.
In her next fight, Álvarez lost a six-round unanimous decision to future WIBA flyweight champion Melinda Cooper.

Professional boxing record

References

1983 births
Living people
Dominican Republic women boxers
People from Santo Domingo
Flyweight boxers
20th-century Dominican Republic women
21st-century Dominican Republic women